"(I'm a) One-Woman Man" is a song co-written by American country music artist Johnny Horton and Tillman Franks. It was originally released as a single by Horton in 1956, whose version peaked at number 7 on the Billboard Hot Country Singles chart.  The song was twice recorded by American country music artist George Jones: first released on the album The Crown Prince of Country Music retitled "One Woman Man" in 1960, and later as "I'm a One Woman Man" released in November 1988 as the first single from his album One Woman Man. It peaked at number 5 on the Billboard Hot Country Singles chart  in early 1989 and it would be his final Top 10 solo hit. His final appearance on the Top-10 country singles chart arrived a year later as part of a duet recording with Randy Travis. In spite of the lack of radio hits as the 1990s dawned Jones remained a popular concert draw for the next two decades and continued to release original recordings into the mid 2000s.

Chart performance

Johnny Horton

George Jones

Year-end charts

Other versions 
Steve Young covered the song on his pioneering Country rock/Outlaw country album Rock Salt & Nails in 1969.
Glen Campbell covered the song on his 1987 album Still Within the Sound of My Voice.
Josh Turner covered the song on his 2007 album Everything Is Fine under the title "One Woman Man."

References 

1956 singles
1988 singles
Johnny Horton songs
Glen Campbell songs
George Jones songs
Josh Turner songs
Columbia Records singles
Epic Records singles
Song recordings produced by Billy Sherrill
Songs written by Tillman Franks
Songs written by Johnny Horton
1956 songs